The 1985–86 Roller Hockey Champions Cup was the 21st edition of the Roller Hockey Champions Cup organized by CERH.

Porto achieved their first title ever.

Teams
The champions of the main European leagues played this competition, consisting in a double-legged knockout tournament. As Spanish champions Barcelona qualified as title holder, Liceo was also admitted as the Spanish representative.

Bracket

Source:

References

External links
 CERH website

1986 in roller hockey
1985 in roller hockey
Rink Hockey Euroleague